Solar erythema is a skin condition characterized by redness of the skin following exposure to ultraviolet light, not to be confused with sunburn.

See also 
 Skin lesion

References 

Skin conditions resulting from physical factors